Frank LaRose (born April 18, 1979) is an American politician. He has served as Secretary of State of Ohio since 2019, after serving two terms as a Republican member of the Ohio State Senate from Ohio's 27th Senate district which includes Wayne County as well as portions of Stark and Summit counties.

Early life, military career and education
LaRose was born at Akron City Hospital and grew up in Copley Township in Summit County, Ohio. His grandfather started the House of LaRose, a beverage bottling and distribution company in Akron, Ohio, where Frank worked growing up. He has four siblings and worked on the family farm growing up. He graduated from Copley High School. He subsequently enlisted in the United States Army in 1998, serving in the 101st Airborne Division and later, the U.S. Special Forces as a green beret. He received the Bronze Star for his service in Iraq.

LaRose's military service played a significant role in cementing a strong belief in protecting elections and voters’ rights. As a green beret, he observed foreign elections, including the Iraqi elections in which voters had their finger dyed purple to prevent voter fraud.

He graduated from Ohio State University with a Bachelor of Science degree in consumer affairs and a minor in business administration.

Ohio Senate career

Ohio Senate election (2010) 
LaRose ran for Ohio Senate in 2010 and defeated the Democratic nominee, Summit County Councilman Frank Comunale, in the 27th District, a Democratic-leaning district, by 56.5% to 43.5%.

Ohio Senate (2011–2013) 
LaRose was sworn into the Ohio Senate in 2011. Governing magazine named him one of "12 State Legislators to Watch in 2014".

LaRose was chair of the Ohio Senate Transportation, Commerce and Workforce Committee, and previously was chair of the State and Local Government Committee and Public Safety, Local Government and Veterans Affairs Committee. He previously was chair of the Joint Committee on Agency Rule Review.

LaRose voted for Senate Bill 5 which reduced collective bargaining rights for public workers (including police, firefighters and teachers). He said that he agonized over the decision. After the bill, which passed by a narrow margin, was repealed by a public referendum, LaRose said, "The voters have made it clear that this was not the course they wished to take." In 2018, LaRose said, "As I look back on [my yes vote on SB5] am I confident I did the right thing? Not necessarily."

LaRose voted for the Congressional Redistricting plan (HB 369) that is now under legal challenge for gerrymandering.

LaRose voted for SB 72 in 2011, a "late-term abortion" ban, which only affects 1% of abortions, and provided no exception for the mother's health. This was reintroduced as HB 78, which lowered the ban from 24 to 20 weeks, but allowed for an exemption for the woman's health.

Ohio Senate (2014–2018)
LaRose won re-election to his seat in 2014 with 67.7% of the vote.

LaRose sponsored SB 63 to create the state's first online voter registration system. LaRose sponsored a bill to eliminate six days of early voting (SB 238) and to prohibit county Board of Elections from sending out unsolicited absentee voting applications. In 2016, he voted for SB 296, introduced by Rep. Bill Seitz, which would require a monetary payment in order to extend voting hours at any vote center for any reason.

Frank LaRose authored more than 67 bills and resolutions during his two terms in the Ohio Senate.  LaRose was named the 2015 Legislator of the Year by the Ohio Association of Election Officials.

Anti-abortion legislation 
The anti-abortion advocacy group Ohio Right to Life endorsed LaRose's opponent in the 2014 Republican primary. LaRose had previously voted against governor John Kasich's nomination of Ohio Right to Life president Mike Gonidakis to the state medical board in 2012. In 2015, LaRose voted for SB 127, a 20-week abortion ban, and cosponsored HB 294, which prohibited public funds for abortion services. In 2016, LaRose supported HB 493, a "heartbeat bill", even though similar bills have been unanimously blocked by the judiciary in several other states.

In 2017, he voted for SB 28, which would require the burial or cremation of fetal remains, identical to a similar bill which had been blocked in Texas. Later that year, he sponsored legislation to prevent women from having abortions after a fetal diagnosis of Down syndrome.

Legislation 
Senate Bill 63

This bill created a cost-saving and convenient online voter registration system which gave Ohio voters the option of submitting a simple form online to register. SB63 also required the Secretary of State to conduct a review of Ohio’s Voter Registration Database to identify non-citizens on the voter rolls. Ohio's secure online system cross-checks the provided voter information with the Bureau of Motor Vehicles' internal database to verify citizenship and other required information. SB 63 was signed into law on June 13, 2016.

Senate Bill 238

This bill removed the unintended five-day period of time where a voter was permitted to register to vote and cast a ballot at the same time, reducing the possibility of voter fraud. SB 238 was signed into law on February 21, 2014.

House Bill 64

LaRose successfully advocated for funding the purchase of electronic poll books in the state operating budget. Electronic poll books make voting more accessible and efficient and helps county boards of elections shorten voting lines while maintaining accuracy. HB 64 was signed into law on June 30, 2015.

Senate Bill 44

LaRose authored legislation to update Ohio’s campaign finance law by allowing campaign finance reports to be filed electronically with local boards of elections. This legislation removed the antiquated paper-only filing requirement that municipal, county and local candidates and campaign committees were forced to use when filing with county boards of elections. This legislation passed the Ohio Senate in multiple General Assemblies and was finally signed into law in 2019.

Ohio Secretary of State

Candidacy for Secretary of State (2018) 
On May 17, 2017, LaRose announced that he would run for Ohio Secretary of State in the 2018 election. LaRose defeated the Democratic state Representative Kathleen Clyde in the general election, 50.9% to 46.7%.

Early during the campaign, LaRose indicated that he would continue enforcing the voter list maintenance state law, known as "purging," which removes voters from voter rolls if those voters had not voted for six consecutive years. Later during the campaign, LaRose said that he thought the process could be better. In 2016, LaRose opposed automatic voter registration, but said during the campaign that he supported automatic voter registration if it included an opt-out clause for those who do not wish to register. While in Ohio Senate, LaRose sponsored legislation to eliminate Ohio's "Golden Week" (a five-day period when Ohioans could register and vote on the same day) as another measure to prevent voter fraud. During the 2018 campaign, LaRose said he favored a different same-day registration system in states such as New Hampshire that take precautions against voter fraud.

During the campaign, Clyde supported a shift to a uniform paper ballot system in Ohio; LaRose said he favored the current system where there is a requirement for a paper trail for ballots but all counties are allowed to use their own machines. Clyde called for the adoption of postal voting to replace early in-person voting; LaRose supported the existing system which is a combination of early in-person voting and requesting absentee ballots.

Ohio Secretary of State (2019–present) 
On January 12, 2019, LaRose was sworn in to serve as Ohio's 51st secretary of state, a four-year term. He was the "first Summit County resident elected Ohio secretary of state in about 166 years", according to Jim Simon, master of ceremonies of LaRose's swearing-in. The Secretary of State offices are in the Continental Plaza high-rise in downtown Columbus.

In April 2019, he observed the Ukrainian presidential election. He promoted simplifying the voter roll maintenance, or "purging," process in May 2019. He also sought automated voter registration, stating that he was crafting an election reform bill on the issue. In May, LaRose defended Ohio's congressional districts, opposed by Democrats for being gerrymandered to favor the Republican representatives in power. In June, he ordered county boards of elections to undergo security upgrades for the 2020 election.

Cleveland.com reported in September 2019 that, as the top election official in Ohio, LaRose had spent "months working on a project to purge Ohio's inactive voters while also trying to address long-standing criticisms of the controversial process". LaRose had focused on fixing issues with voter list maintenance, including, for the first time, publishing the names of voters who could be removed from the voter rolls for inactivity. This increase in transparency led to finding various mistakes and recognizing thousands of voters who had been unduly marked as inactive by their respective counties. He was urged to halt the state law required voter list maintenance of inactive voters by Democrats over errors, but he defended the "purge." That month, his office was reviewing Ohio voter registrations that might have been incorrectly deleted in vendor errors, with Democrats suing. The state ultimately determined that around 40,000 entries included on the list of 235,000 voters to be purged were errors, thanks to the list of inactive voters being made public for the first time by Secretary LaRose.

In September 2019, he was released from a February 2019 lawsuit filed by members of environmental activist groups, who "accused elections officials of using unconstitutional tactics that kept certain initiatives from going before voters". That month, he also claimed that Ohio had the most secure elections in the United States. On September 19, he said he was in the process of distributing $12.8 million Election Assistance Commission funds. 
 
On October 25, 2019, the Ohio Governor signed Senate Bill 52 (originally sponsored by Secretary LaRose while he was in the state senate), which strengthened Ohio’s cybersecurity and elections infrastructure, required post-election audits by all county boards of elections, and made LaRose a member of Ohio’s Homeland Security Advisory Council.

In December 2019, LaRose recommended 77 non-citizens who voted and 18 voters who voted twice to the attorney general and county prosecutors.

Following the 2020 United States elections held on November 3, 2020, LaRose stated that there were "no serious irregularities with voting", contrary to president Donald Trump's false claims of election fraud.

2020 Primary Election 
Before the 2020 Primary Election, with COVID cases appearing in Ohio, Secretary LaRose took action to protect the health of voters and poll workers, including relocating polling sites away from senior living facilities, recruiting new, younger poll workers, and requiring curbside absentee ballot drop-off at the county boards of elections on election day during voting hours.

On March 16, the day before the primary election, the Ohio Department of Health recommended all Ohioans over the age of 65 self-quarantine and Governor DeWine asked the Ohio Supreme Court to delay the primary until a later date (June 2), as the Governor or the Secretary of State lack the authority to move an election. Secretary LaRose proposed sending absentee ballot requests to every voter, followed by prepaid absentee ballots to those who requested one, with an in person election day on June 2.

The Ohio legislature chose April 28 as the postponed vote-by-mail only election day with a bipartisan plan, approved unanimously by the Ohio House and Senate, including sending postcards to every Ohioan with instructions on how to apply for an absentee ballot. The plan also allowed for one secure drop box per county board of elections for voters to place their absentee ballots if they did not have time to mail them.

On April 28, there were reports of long car lines outside county boards of elections as Ohioans who were not able to mail their absentee ballots the day before had to drop them off to make sure their vote counted. Mailed ballots were also taking longer, sometimes 7–9 days, to reach voters.

Reelection campaign (2021–present) 
In May 2021, LaRose announced his bid for reelection in the 2022 Ohio Secretary of State election.

The Columbus Dispatch reported in 2022 that LaRose had "maintained a careful balance between champion of Ohio elections and skeptic of how other states conducted voting" since 2020. While a spokesman for LaRose's campaign told the Dispatch that "Ohio's elections are well-run and run with integrity", the Dispatch noted that LaRose had additionally "espoused a sense of urgency around voter fraud in recent months" during his reelection campaign. In April, Trump announced his endorsement of LaRose at a rally held in Delaware, Ohio.

LaRose defeated state representative John Adams in the Republican primary held on May 3, 2022. After his victory in the Republican primary, he was set to run against Democratic candidate Chelsea Clark, a member of the Forest Park city council, and conservative podcaster Terpsehore Maras, an independent candidate who has supported QAnon conspiracy theories, in the November general elections. A challenge to Maras' inclusion on the election ballot, filed by the Ohio Republican Party in August, led LaRose's office to rule that Maras failed to gather sufficient signatures to run in the election.

Personal life
According to his official Ohio Senate biography, LaRose lives in Columbus, Ohio, with his wife, Lauren, and their three daughters. He was an Eagle Scout. He is a board member of the Ohio Historical Society, a junior vice commander of the Fairlawn Veterans of Foreign Wars and a member of the executive board for the Great Trail Council, Boy Scouts of America.

On January 24, 2022, LaRose's office announced that he had tested positive for COVID-19, several days after a meeting with the Ohio Redistricting Commission.

References

External links 
 The Ohio Senate: Senator Frank LaRose (R) - District 27
 Frank LaRose, official campaign website
 

1979 births
21st-century American politicians
United States Army personnel of the Iraq War
Living people
Members of the United States Army Special Forces
Ohio Republicans
Ohio state senators
Ohio State University alumni
People from Copley, Ohio
Politicians from Akron, Ohio
Secretaries of State of Ohio
United States Army soldiers